Nikos Pangalos (14 February 1915 – 21 March 2002) was a Greek football manager.

References

1915 births
2002 deaths
Greek football managers
PAOK FC managers
Panserraikos F.C. managers